Dance Chronicle: Studies in Dance and the Related Arts is a triannual peer-reviewed academic journal focusing on dance. It was established in 1977 and first published in 1978 by Marcel Dekker. The founding editors-in-chief were George Dorris and Jack Anderson, who edited the journal for thirty years, until 2007. In 2003, publication of the journal was transferred to Routledge. The current co-editors are Joellen Meglin and Lynn Matluck Brooks.

The journal covers a wide range of topics relating to dance, including music, theater, film, literature, painting, and aesthetics. Individual issues have been devoted to such topics as Moscow's Island of Dance, August Bournonville, and the Camargo Society.

External links 
 

Arts journals
Taylor & Francis academic journals
Publications established in 1977
Triannual journals
English-language journals